In Ireland, grinds are private tuition; a major industry in Ireland, particularly at secondary school level.

In 2012, the Office of the Revenue Commissioners launched an investigation into a perceived failure of some teachers to declare extra income from giving grinds for tax purposes. The teachers' union ASTI denied that this is a widespread problem.

Some schools such as Ashfield College, Bruce College, Institute of Education, Leinster Senior College, and Yeats College which offer the Leaving Certificate as a single year (repeat) course are called grind schools.

A study in 2020 indicated the students from Irish-speaking post primary schools and grind schools had strong chances to progressing to further education but were significantly less likely to finish their course or achieve a 2:1 degree or greater compared to students from secondary schools.

References

 
 
 
 

Irish slang
Secondary education in Ireland